The Department of Tourism, Heritage and Culture is a department of the government of New Brunswick.

It was created in 2001 as the Department of Tourism and Parks from the Business New Brunswick and Department of Investment and Exports. Its mandate promote the province's tourism industry and maintain its official provincial parks.

Its mandate was widely expanded in March 2012 when Premier David Alward restructured government. It was merged with the Department of Wellness, Culture and Sport to form the new Department of Culture, Tourism and Healthy-Living. This new department was short-lived however with it being split back up in October 2012 into the Department of Tourism, Heritage and Culture (which held the mandate of the former Department of Tourism and Parks as well as an oversight of community arts development and heritage programs) and a Department of Healthy and Inclusive Communities.

Ministers

References

External links
Tourism and Parks website 

Tourism, Heritage and Culture
New Brunswick
New Brunswick